The Marianas Trench Marine National Monument is a United States National Monument created by President George W. Bush by the presidential proclamation no. 8335 on January 6, 2009. The monument includes no dry land area, but protects  of submerged lands and waters in various places in the Mariana Archipelago.  The United States could create this monument under international law because the maritime exclusive economic zones of the adjacent Northern Mariana Islands and Guam fall within its jurisdiction.

Scope
The Mariana Trench Marine National Monument consists of 95,216 square miles (60,938,240 acres). The monument consists of submerged lands and waters of the Mariana Archipelago. It includes three units:

 Islands Unit – the waters and submerged lands of the three northernmost Mariana Islands (Farallon de Pajaros or Uracas, Maug, and Asuncion)
 Volcanic Unit (Mariana Arc of Fire National Wildlife Refuge) – the submerged lands within 1 nautical mile of 21 designated volcanic sites
 Trench Unit (Mariana Trench National Wildlife Refuge) – the submerged lands extending from the northern limit of the Exclusive Economic Zone of the United States in the Commonwealth of the Northern Mariana Islands (CNMI) to the southern limit of the Exclusive Economic Zone of the United States in the Guam.

No waters are included in the Volcanic and Trench Units, and CNMI maintains all authority for managing the three islands within the Islands Unit above the mean low water line. The Interior Secretary placed the Mariana Trench and Volcanic Units within the National Wildlife Refuge System, and delegated his management responsibility to the Fish and Wildlife Service.

The Secretary of Commerce, through the National Oceanic and Atmospheric Administration, has primary management responsibility for fishery-related activities in the waters of the Islands Unit.

Islands Unit 

In the Islands Unit, unique reef habitats support marine biological communities dependent on basalt rock foundations, unlike those throughout the remainder of the Pacific. These reefs and waters are among the most biologically diverse in the Western Pacific and include the greatest diversity of seamount and hydrothermal vent life yet discovered. They also contain one of the most diverse collections of stony corals in the Western Pacific, including more than 300 species, higher than any other U.S. reef area.

The submerged caldera at Maug is one of only a few known places in the world where photosynthetic and chemosynthetic communities of life coexist. The caldera is some 1.5 miles wide and 820 feet deep, an unusual depth for lagoons. The lava dome in the center of the crater rises to within 65 feet of the surface. Hydrothermal vents at about 475 feet in depth along the northeast side of the dome spew acidic water at scalding temperatures near the coral reef that quickly ascends to the sea surface. Thus, coral reefs and microbial mats are spared much of the impact of these plumes and are growing nearby, complete with thriving tropical fish. As ocean acidification increases across the Earth, this caldera offers scientists an opportunity to look into the future and ensure continuation of coral reef communities.

Mariana Arc of Fire National Wildlife Refuge (Volcanic Unit) 

The Mariana Arc of Fire National Wildlife Refuge (Volcanic Unit) – an arc of 21 undersea mud volcanoes and thermal vents – supports unusual life forms in some of the harshest conditions imaginable. Here species survive in the midst of hydrothermal vents that produce highly acidic boiling water. Three of the volcanos are also within the Islands Unit.

The Champagne hydrothermal vent, found at the Northwest Eifuku submarine volcano produces almost pure liquid carbon dioxide, one of only two known sites in the world.
A pool of liquid sulfur at the Daikoku submarine volcano is unique.

Mariana Trench National Wildlife Refuge (Trench Unit) 
The Challenger Deep, located just outside the Trench Unit, is the deepest point in the Earth's oceans, deeper than the height of Mount Everest above sea level. The Sirena Deep, about 6.6 miles beneath the surface, is the deepest point of the Mariana Trench Marine National Monument.

Name of monument
In a White House release the first word is pluralized as Marianas, in another seemingly official source it is named Mariana, and in some news reports it appeared as Marianas Marine National Monument, omitting the word "Trench". In common usage, the trench is alternatively named Marianas Trench or Mariana Trench.

The actual text of the proclamation establishing it gives it the official name Marianas Trench Marine National Monument.

See also
 List of national monuments of the United States

References

External links

 Mariana Trench Marine National Monument - US Fish and Wildlife Service
Draft Monument Management Plan and Environmental Assessment
 Marianas Trench Marine National Monument – NOAA
 Mariana Arc of Fire National Wildlife Refuge
 Mariana Trench National Wildlife Refuge
 official map (PDF)

National monuments in insular areas of the United States
Protected areas established in 2009
Protected areas of Guam
Protected areas of Northern Mariana Islands
2009 establishments in the Northern Mariana Islands
2009 establishments in Guam
Mariana Islands